Richard Raffan  (born 1943) is a well-known woodturner, author, and instructor who has helped popularize the craft of woodturning since the 1970s. He was a part of the "art turning" movement that saw turned objects move into galleries where they are presented as works of art.  Although he has created large and valuable works of exotic woods, in his books he has also championed simple utilitarian works created for daily use. He finishes much of this work simply, using vegetable oil and beeswax, and has written admiringly of the patina of well used wooden items. "An indescribable surface that begs for a caress of the hand--that's what I think wood should provide."

He was born at Zeal Monachorum in Devon in the UK, lived in Sydney, Australia from 1947 to 1950, and returned to Devon where he was raised. He emigrated to Australia in 1982.

Books
Richard Raffan has written the following books published by Taunton Press:
 Taunton's Complete Illustrated Guide to Turning (2004). .
 The Art of Turned Bowls (2008). .
 Turning Bowls with Richard Raffan (2001), .
 Turning Boxes with Richard Raffan (2002). .
 Turning Projects with Richard Raffan, Third Edition (2008). .
 Turning Wood with Richard Raffan, Third Edition(2008). .
 Woodturning Basics (2007). (Contributor) Special issue of Fine Woodworking

Richard Raffan has starred in the following videos:
 The New Turning Wood DVD (2008). .
 Turning Bowls DVD (2009). .
 Turning Boxes DVD. .
 Turning Projects DVD. .

Style
Richard is known for using native Australian woods, for the architectural influences in his turned objects, and for his groupings of related objects into sets (e.g. his "Citadel" and "Tower" series of boxes, etc.)

External links
Richard Raffan's personal website
Richard Raffan's YouTube channel

References

Woodturners
Living people
1943 births